Thy Kingdom Come is a 2018 American short film directed by Eugene Richards and starring Javier Bardem.  It is a spinoff of Terrence Malick's 2012 feature film To the Wonder.  Thy Kingdom Come consists of cut footage from To the Wonder.

Cast
Javier Bardem
Callie Elred
Tasia Moore

Release
Thy Kingdom Come premiered at the South by Southwest Film Festival on March 10, 2018.

Reception
Bradley Gibson of Film Threat gave the film a 7 out of 10.

References

External links
 
 
 

2018 films
2018 short films
American short films
2010s English-language films